The Sports Emmy Awards, or Sports Emmys, are part of the extensive range of Emmy Awards for artistic and technical merit for the American television industry. Bestowed by the National Academy of Television Arts and Sciences (NATAS), the Sports Emmys are presented in recognition of excellence in American sports television programming, including sports-related series, live coverage of sporting events, and best sports announcers. The awards ceremony, presenting Emmys from the previous calendar year, is usually held on a Spring Monday night, sometime in the last two weeks in April or the first week in May. The Sports Emmy Awards are all given away at one ceremony, unlike the Primetime Emmy Awards and the Daytime Emmy Awards, which hold a "Creative Arts" ceremony in which Emmys are given to behind-the-scenes personnel.

History
The first Emmy for "Best Sports Coverage" was handed out at the second annual Primetime Emmy Awards ceremony in 1950, where KTLA, a local television station in Los Angeles, won the award for coverage of wrestling. The following year, another Los Angeles-based station, KNBH, won an Emmy for their coverage of the Los Angeles Rams American football team. At the seventh Primetime Emmys in 1955, NBC became the first major network to win a Sports Emmy Award for its series, the Gillette Cavalcade of Sports.

In 1979, an Emmys exclusively for sports coverage was held for the first time at the Rainbow Room in New York City. Winners included golf announcer Jack Whitaker, and CBS's The NFL Today. The ninth annual Sports Emmy Awards, hosted by actors Alan Thicke and Joan Van Ark and held on July 13, 1988, became the first Sports Emmys ceremony to be televised; the live telecast was syndicated nationwide by Raycom Sports. Dennis Miller hosted in the 12th Sports Emmys in 1991, which was broadcast on ESPN.

Rules
Among the Sports Emmy rules, a show must originally air on American television during the eligibility period between January 1 and December 31, and to at least 50 percent of the country. A show that enters into the Sports Emmys cannot also be entered into any other national Emmy competition. Certain shows and segments that air on sports networks that are more entertainment or news, including award shows, the opening and closing ceremonies of the Olympics, and the Super Bowl halftime show, are ineligible for the Sports Emmys.

Entries must be submitted by mid-January. Most award categories also require entries to include DVDs or tape masters of the show. For most program categories, the submitted DVDs should feature up to five excerpts. For most personality categories, there is no limit in the number of segments submitted, but the DVD should not run over a total of 12 minutes.

Voting is done by peer judging panels between February and early March. The Academy solicits anybody with significant experience in national sports production to serve as
judges. The panels are organized so that they only have one representative from each corporate entity (i.e. Paramount Global, Disney, NBCUniversal, Fox Corporation, Warner Bros. Discovery etc.) Most categories only have a single voting round using preferential scoring system. The top 5 entries in each category are announced as the "nominations", and then the top entry is announced as the Emmy winner later at the awards ceremony.

When a show wins a Sports Emmy, each member of the crew that worked on the production is eligible to purchase an Emmy statue, provided that their job title corresponds to the category that the show won the award in. This policy can result in many different people "winning" an Emmy for a single production; for example, when the Olympics on NBC wins an award for Outstanding Technical Team (Remote), as often occurs, the hundreds of personnel working on the production all have the right to purchase an Emmy statue. Depending on the production, the show or network that won the award will sometimes pay for the purchase of statues for the entire crew.

Categories
At that inaugural ceremony in 1979, there were 12 categories. The 43rd ceremony in 2022 awarded the following 47 competitive categories:

Programming
Outstanding Live Sports Special
Outstanding Live Sports Series
Outstanding Playoff Coverage
Outstanding Edited Event Coverage
Outstanding Edited Special
Outstanding Hosted Edited Series
Outstanding Esports Championship Coverage
Outstanding Short Documentary
Outstanding Long Documentary
Outstanding Documentary Series
Outstanding Documentary Series - Serialized
Outstanding Open/Tease
Outstanding Studio Show - Weekly
Outstanding Studio Show - Daily
Outstanding Studio Show - Limited Run
Outstanding Journalism
Outstanding Short Feature
Outstanding Long Feature
Outstanding Studio Show in Spanish
Outstanding Feature Story in Spanish
Outstanding Interactive Experience - Event Coverage
Outstanding Interactive Experience - Original Programming
Outstanding Digital Innovation
Outstanding Promotional Announcement
Outstanding Public Service Announcement/Campaign

Personality
Outstanding Sports Personality, Studio Host
Outstanding Sports Personality, Play-by-Play
Outstanding Sports Personality, Studio Analyst
Outstanding Sports Personality, Sports Event Analyst
Outstanding Sports Personality, Sports Reporter
Outstanding Sports Personality/Emerging On-Air Talent
Outstanding On-Air Personality in Spanish

Technical
Outstanding Technical Team Event
Outstanding Technical Team Studio
Outstanding Camera Work - Short Form
Outstanding Camera Work - Long Form
Outstanding Editing - Short Forn
Outstanding Editing - Long Form
Outstanding Music Direction
Outstanding Studio or Production Design/Art Direction
Outstanding Audio/Sound - Live Event
Outstanding Audio/Sound - Post-Produced
Outstanding Graphic Design - Event/Show
Outstanding Graphic Design - Specialty
The Dick Schaap Outstanding Writing Award Short Form
Outstanding Writing Award Long Form
The George Wensel Technical Achievement Award

Special awards
Sports Lifetime Achievement Award

Defunct categories
Outstanding Host or Commentator
Outstanding Analyst
Outstanding Achievement In Content For Non-Traditional Delivery Platforms

Multiple wins by a Series
9 wins
NBC Sunday Night Football

8 wins
College GameDay
Inside the NBA
Monday Night Football

7 wins
NFL GameDay/Sunday NFL Countdown

6 wins
MLB Tonight

5 wins
Inside the NFL
NFL on CBS
The NFL Today

4 wins
CBS's coverage of the NCAA Division I men's basketball tournament
Fox NFL Sunday
Major League Baseball on Fox
NASCAR on Fox
SportsCenter

3 wins

Pardon the Interruption

2 wins

ESPN SpeedWorld
ESPN Sunday Night Football

Multiple wins by a Personality
23 wins
 Bob Costas

16 wins
 Cris Collinsworth
 John Madden

9 wins
 Jim McKay
 Mike Emrick

7 wins
 Joe Buck
 Al Michaels

6 wins
 Ernie Johnson, Jr.

4 wins
 Charles Barkley
Dick Enberg
 Bill Raftery

3 wins
 Terry Bradshaw
 James Brown
 Kirk Herbstreit
 Keith Jackson
 Tim McCarver
 Harold Reynolds
 Tom Verducci

2 wins
 Joe Morgan
 Jim Nantz
 Ken Rosenthal
 Michele Tafoya

See also

 List of American television awards
 List of sports journalism awards

References

External links
 

 
Sports mass media in the United States
+Sp
Sportscasting awards
American sports trophies and awards